Kuzucu is a village in Mezitli. The population of the village  is 297  as of 2012.

References

Villages in Mezitli District